Scrinium impendens is a species of sea snail, a marine gastropod mollusk in the family Mitromorphidae.

Description
The length of the shell attains 6.4 mm, its diameter 2.5 mm.

(Original description) The solid, white shell contains 7 whorls, including the blunt protoconch of 2 smooth depressed convex turns. The spire-whorls are sloping, swollen above the linear somewhat undulating suture, and barely swollen below it. The base of the shell is slightly contracted. The aperture is oblong-oval, narrower behind, widely open in front, with a shallow notch. The outer lip is simple, sharp, thickened by a marked varix outside, which ascends roundly at the suture and bounds a shallow, wide posterior sinus. The profile is convex, barely sinused anteriorly. The axial ribs are roundly trigonal, sinuous, undulating the upper suture, most valid at the swelling of the whorl, half as wide as the interspaces, vanishing towards the base, and becoming obsolete towards the aperture. There are very crowded spiral incisions all over, and still finer sinuous axial growth scratches, finely granulating the surface.<ref>[https://archive.org/details/transactionspro331909roya  Verco, J.C. 1909. Notes on South Australian marine Mollusca with descriptions of new species. Part XII; Transactions of the Royal Society of South Australia v. 33 (1909)]</ref>

Distribution
This marine species is endemic to Australia and occurs off South Australia.

References

 Hedley, C. 1922. A revision of the Australian Turridae.'' Records of the Australian Museum 13(6): 213–359, pls 42–56
 

impendens
Gastropods described in 1909
Gastropods of Australia